Dorin Damir (born 20 March 1972) is the vice president of the Judo Federation of Moldova (2005 - 2012), the president of the Fighting & Entertainment Association of Moldova (FEA), the president of the Moldovan Amateur K-1 Federation (WAK-1F Moldova), vice president of the World Amateur K-1 Federation, WAK-1F, and a businessman.

Biography
Dorin is the president of the Fighting & Entertainment Association of Moldova (FEA), president of the Moldovan Amateur K-1 Federation of (WAK-1F Moldova), and the vice president of the World Amateur K-1 Federation, (WAK-1F).

Dorin completed high school in 1987 and college in 1991, after graduating college he entered the National Police Academy. Upon completing his training at the Academy he worked in a special unit of the Ministry of Internal Affairs of the Republic of Moldova (Department for Combating Corruption and Organized Crime).

In 2002, Dorin was transferred to the reserve, since 2002 he has worked in the field of business, security, investment, consulting, and real estate. He obtained his bachelor's degree in International Economic Relations and later a master's degree in Sports Management. He is married and has three children.

From 2005 to 2012 he retained a position as vice president of the Moldova Judo Federation.

Awards and honors
Dorin holds the 1st Dan Black Belt in Taekwondo, he is also a hand-to-hand combat instructor. He is still practicing boxing and Muay Thai.
Contribution to the development of martial arts in the Republic of Moldova.

In 2009, Damir Dorin founded the Fighting & Entertainment Association of Moldova (FEA) which aims to promotion of Moldovan fighters to world rings and tatami, propaganda of healthy lifestyle among young people and popularization of K-1 in Moldova. In 2009, there was held the first FEA GP tournament with the participation of Moldovan fighters in the 84kg weight class. The fighting took place among the top eight fighters. Together with the Japanese and European partners Damir Dorin established the King OF Kings Project (KOK). In 2010, for the first time in Moldova there was held the BUSHIDO FC tournament, 5 fights according to the MMA rules and 5 fights according to the K-1 rules. In 2011, Damir Dorin registered the FIGHTING EAGLES Project which in a short time has gained huge popularity in Moldova. Being a man of his word, Damir Dorin continues holding tournaments. To date there have been held nine major events.

Championships organized
 GRAND PRIX FEA 2009 K-1 rules
 FEA presents BUSHIDO FC IN MOLDOVA 2010 Moldova VS Europe
 K-1 PRESENTS K.O.K. WORLD GRAND PRIX 2010 IN CHISINAU
 FEA PRESENTS K.O.K. EUROPE GRAND PRIX 2011
 K.O.K. WORLD GRAND PRIX 2011 LIGHT HEAVYWEIGHT 83 kg
 FEA PRESENTS "FIGHTING EAGLES" EUROPE SERIES K-1 & MMA RULES 2011
 "K.O.K. EUROPE GRAND PRIX 2012 Light Welterweight 63 kg"
 "FEA PRESENTS Vol. 8 KOK WORLD GP 2012 LIGHTWEIGHT TOURNAMENT"
 FEA PRESENTS Vol. 9 "FIGHTING EAGLES" EUROPE SERIES K-1 & MMA RULES 2012
 FEA presents Vol. 10 K-1 WORLD GP 2013 LIGHT HEAVYWEIGHT Tournament in Moldova.
 FEA presents Vol. 11 KOK WORLD GP 2013 Middleweight Tournament in CHISINAU.
 FEA presents Vol. 12 EAGLES KOK WORLD SERIES 2013
 FEA presents Vol. 13 KOK WORLD GP 2014 Middleweight Tournament in CHISINAU.
 FEA presents KOK WORLD GP 2014 in CHISINAU 19 September 2014 Vol. 21
 FEA presents Vol. 25 KOK WORLD GP HEAVYWEIGHT TOURNAMENT EAGLES SERIES 2014 in MOLDOVA
 KOK WORLD GP Middleweight Tournament 2015 in MOLDOVA Vol. 27 April 4
 KOK WGP 2015 Heavyweight Tournament EAGLES SERIES in Moldova. 26 September
 KOK WGP 2015 Welterweight Tournament EAGLES SERIES in Moldova 19/12/15/.Vol.32
 KOK WGP 2016 Middleweight Tournament in Moldova. Vol. 37 April 9.
 FEA presents KOK WORLD GP 01.10.16
 KOK WORLD GP 2016 in MOLDOVA Vol.42 December 10
 KOK WORLD GP 2017 in MOLDOVA Vol.46 April 1 
 KOK WORLD GP 2017 in MOLDOVA Vol.48 September 30
 KOK WORLD GP 2017 in MOLDOVA Vol. 53 December 9
 KOK WORLD GP 2018 in MOLDOVA Vol, 56 March 24
FEA WORLD GP vol.26 6 October 2018
FEA  27 K-1 Rules 8 December. 2018
FEA WGP vol.28. 30 March 2019.
FEA WORLD GP ODESSA 24 August 2019
FEA KICKBOXING WGP 7 Dec 2019
FEA KICKBOXING RESET 13.03.2021
FEA KEEPGRINDING 13.11.2021

WAK-1F Moldova
Being the President of the Moldovan Amateur K-1 Federation, for the first time in the Republic of Moldova Damir Dorin organized the Amateur K-1 Championship. More than 200 athletes from 22 Moldovan sports clubs participated in the Republic Championship. Fighters from Moldova WAK-1F Federation successfully participate in the K-1 European Championship, in the Asian Open Championship, and the European Cup.

EAGLES FC (Fighting Championship)
EAGLES FC (Fighting Championship) the new unique Moldavian combative project which will pass by rules MMA. The name EAGLES is given the project not incidentally. In translation of EAGLES means eagles. The symbolics of an eagle is shaped through a prism of centuries. And as all know the Eagle it is a symbol of freedom, valor and courage. The eagle is located not gift on the coats of arms of world powers. Presently an example of courage are fighters thanks to whom the country colors with honor are hoisted on the world scene. Marking about a victory not only the fighter of the participant, but also all country. Famous fighters and beginners will take part in the new EAGLES FC project as already all, Which names will only start being lit on the arena of glory. EAGLES FC are athletes to whom barriers aren't terrible and which go all the way.
 EAGLES I Fighting Championship 27 February 2016
 EAGLES II Elimination Tournament & Fighting Championship 27 May 2016
 EAGLES III Elimination Tournament & Fighting Championship 14 November 2016. 
 EAGLES IV Elimination Tournament & Fighting Championship 18 February 2017
 EAGLES V Elimination Tournament & Fighting Championship 20 May 2017
 EAGLES VI Russia VS Moldova 24 June 2017
 EAGLES VII Elimination Tournament & Fighting Championship 4 November 2017
 EAGLES VIII Elimination Tournament & Fighting Championship 10 February 2018
EAGLES MMA IX 26 May 2018
EAGLES 10 MMA Elimination Tournament & Fighting Championship 3 November 2018
EAGLES 11 Elimination Tournament & Fighting Championship 15 February 2019
EAGLES ELIMINATION SUMMER EDITION 22 June 2019
EAGLES ELIMINATION 26 OCTOBER 2019
EAGLES NEXT LEVEL. 15.02.2020
EAGLES RESET 13 March 2021
EAGLES FC DANGER ZONE 13 November 2021

References

1972 births
Living people
Moldovan sports businesspeople
Moldovan male judoka
People from Călărași District